Ayatollah Sayyid Muhammad Ali al-Hakim (1911–2011) was a high-ranking Shiite ayatollah. Ayatollah Muhammad al-Hakim was the father of the Grand Ayatollah Mohammad Saeed Al-Hakim.

Biography

Family tree
Muhammad Ali al-Hakim is a member of the Hakim Family of Shiite scholars.

Early life
He was born in 1911 CE to the al-Hakim Family of scholars. His father was Sayyid Ahmad al-Hakim. His teachers included his uncle, Grand Ayatollah Sayyid Muhsin al-Hakim, Sheikh Hussain al-Hilli, and Ayatollah Muhammad Hussain al-Isfehani. He had five sons who also became religious scholars, including Grand Ayatollah Sayyid Mohammad Saeed Al-Hakim, who is one of the top four Grand Ayatollahs of Iraq, alongside Grand Ayatollah Sayyid Ali al-Sistani.

Death
Al-Hakim died of natural causes at the age of 100, and was buried on February 27, 2011. 

Funeral prayers were led by his eldest son, Sayyid Muhammad Saeed al-Hakim, and he was interred at Masjid al-Hindi, in Najaf, Iraq, close to his uncle Muhsin al-Hakim.

Works
Al-Hakim was a top scholar of fiqh and principles of fiqh. He was also an expert in the fields of Islamic spirituality and ethics.

Muhammad Ali al-Hakim extensively studied the role of modern high-level mathematics to the field of Islamic inheritance law.

He wrote extensive religious treatises on the works of Sayyid Muhsin al-Hakim as well as Sayyid Muhammad Hussain al-Isfehani

See also
 List of marjas

References

1911 births
2011 deaths
Iraqi ayatollahs